Francis Henry Fries (February 1, 1855 – 5 June 1931) was an American textile businessman and industrialist from North Carolina.

Biography
Francis Henry Fries was born on February 1, 1855, in Winston-Salem, North Carolina. His parents were Francis Levin Fries and Lisetta Maria Vogler. Fries attended the Salem Boys' School, and later graduated from Davidson College in 1874. At 21 years old, Fries joined his father's textile firm, F & H Fries Manufacturing Company, working as a mechanic and a blacksmith. During his tenure he would work in all of the company's departments. In 1878, Fries traveled with his brother and uncle to Europe, visiting the United Kingdom, France, Germany, Switzerland, and Italy. Upon his return he was promoted to superintendent. On November 23, 1881 he married Letitia Walker Patterson, granddaughter of Governor John Motley Morehead. She and their only child died three years later, both around the same time. In 1886, Fries married Anna P. de Schweinitz, later having a daughter with her. That year he also oversaw the construction of Arista Mills, the first textile mill in North Carolina to have electric lighting.

In 1887, Fries left his father's company. Instead, he was prompted undertake an effort to connect Winston-Salem to Roanoke, Virginia by rail to improve commerce. Supervising all financing and construction, Fries completed what became known as the Roanoke and Southern Railway in four years. He served as the railway's first president. As a Democrat, he served on the staff of Governor Alfred Moore Scales, where he earned the title of "Colonel" which he would use in his professional career to distinguish himself from his father. In 1893, Fries went into banking and became president of the Wachovia Loan and Trust Company. Looking for areas to develop along the Southern Railway, Fries began exploring the possibility of setting up textile mills along the Mayo River. In 1895 he erected the Mayo Mill and established the town of Mayodan. In 1900 Fries purchased rural farmland surrounding Bartlett Falls on the New River in Grayson County, Virginia. He then hired a local labor force to build a dam, a cotton mill and a full-service company owned town. By 1901, the New River Train was extended to the mill site and Fries petitioned the Virginia State Legislature to incorporate the new town of Carico, Virginia. For reasons that are not well documented, the town name was instead legislatively changed to Fries, Virginia and officially incorporated in 1902. In 1904, he was elected president of the North Carolina Bankers Association. From 1911–1912 Fries served as the president of the trust company section of the American Bankers Association. On November 15, 1917 he was appointed to be director of the state branch of the National War Savings Committee.

Fries died on June 5, 1931.

See also
Rufus Lenoir Patterson

References 

American Bankers Association
American industrialists
1855 births
1931 deaths
People from Winston-Salem, North Carolina
Businesspeople from North Carolina
American textile industry businesspeople
19th-century American businesspeople
20th-century American businesspeople